Fanatics, Inc. is an American online manufacturer and retailer of licensed sportswear, sports collectibles, NFTs, trading cards, and sports merchandise, as well as sports betting and iGaming. The company began as an American online retailer of licensed sportswear and merchandise, which operates the e-commerce businesses of major professional sports leagues and media brands, as well as hundreds of collegiate and professional team properties.

History 

Michael G. Rubin is the CEO of Fanatics. In 1998, Rubin created an apparel and logistics company, Global Sports Incorporated, which would later turn into GSI Commerce, a multibillion-dollar e-commerce company. In 2011, Rubin acquired Fanatics from its founders, brothers Alan and Mitchell Trager; the Florida-based sports retailer had an e-commerce presence across college and professional teams, and the new assets merged into GSI. Rubin sold GSI to eBay later that year for $2.4 billion and bought back the sports e-commerce business, which included online stores for all North American sports leagues along with hundreds of teams and colleges, keeping the name Fanatics, Inc for the new company moving forward.

Post-merger 
In April 2012, Fanatics raised $150 million from Insight Venture Partners and Andreessen Horowitz and acquired its Florida-based rival Dreams, Inc. for $158 million in cash and $25 million in debt. This move added the brands Fans Edge and Mounted Memories, which was rebranded as Fanatics Authentic division.

Rubin’s vision was to differentiate Fanatics by serving the real-time expectations of global sports fans and partners. In 2014, Doug Mack was appointed CEO and Fanatics opened a Bay Area office to tap into the Silicon Valley tech talent pool. Mack helped Fanatics move from a domestic e-commerce business to a mobile-first, direct-to-consumer brand with its own manufacturing capabilities. Priorities such as real-time manufacturing, data, and technology, would guide the company’s innovative vertical commerce (v-commerce) model.

In 2015, Fanatics raised $300 million from Silver Lake Partners and in early 2016 the company acquired UK-based internet retailer Kitbag to accelerate focus around international expansion and global soccer.

In April 2017, Fanatics bought sportswear and merchandise manufacturer and MLB uniform provider Majestic Athletic from VF Corporation in an effort to add to the company’s growing vertical manufacturing capabilities. Nike would eventually take over as MLB’s official on-field uniform partner, with Fanatics using the existing facilities acquired during the Majestic acquisition to now make Nike MLB uniforms. 

In September 2017, Fanatics closed a $1 billion round of fundraising led by Softbank, with participation from the NFL, MLB, NHL, MLS and NFLPA. As of that year, Fanatics was expected to produce $2.2 billion in annual revenue. The next month, Fanatics acquired Fermata Partners to transform the college licensed sports business and a new Fanatics College division was formed.

In the following two years, Fanatics announced 10-year deals with Nike, the National Football League and Major League Baseball that granted Fanatics the rights to design, manufacture and distribute all Nike fan gear sold at retail for both leagues.

At the onset of the pandemic in early 2020, Fanatics and MLB halted production of MLB jerseys to manufacture masks and gowns for emergency personnel battling COVID-19. 
Using the exact same material that was previously used to make Yankees, Red Sox, Phillies and all other MLB jerseys, that fabric was instead used to make more than one million masks and gowns that were eventually shipped to more than a dozen states.

In April 2020, Michael Rubin—with the help of Fanatics employees around the world—launched the ALL IN Challenge, one of the largest digital fundraisers in history. The celebrity and athlete driven ALL IN Challenge exploded on social media and raised $60 million dollars to provide nearly 300 million meals for Feeding America, Meals on Wheels, No Kid Hungry, and World Central Kitchen. Also in 2020, Fanatics established the All-In Challenge Foundation, which will continue to serve as the philanthropic arm of the company.

In August 2020, the company secured $350 million Series E funding raising Fanatics’ valuation to $6.2 billion. Using the new funds, Fanatics purchased assets from Vetta Brands, including leading collegiate headwear producer Top of the World. This acquisition saved more than 200 jobs and added significant headwear scale and capabilities. 
In December 2020, Fanatics acquired WinCraft, the preeminent licensed hardgoods and promotional products company, which increased the company’s presence with non-apparel merchandise.

Global Digital Sports Platform (2021-Current Day) 

In March 2021, Fanatics secured a $320 million funding round, followed by another $325 million in August 2021 that brought the company's valuation to $18 billion as of September 2021.[1] During the latter funding round, Fanatics also announced plans to evolve into a global digital sports platform through expansion into new verticals, including NFTs, trading cards, gambling and gaming, ticketing, media and more. With the move, Rubin assumed the new role of CEO of the larger Fanatics company, with Doug Mack remaining CEO of Fanatics Commerce and serving as Vice Chairman of the broader business.[1][3][4]

In May 2021, Rubin co-founded the digital collectibles company Candy Digital with Mike Novogratz and Gary Vaynerchuk.  Candy Digital secured an exclusive, long-term agreement with MLB as its first content partner. Later that year, Candy Digital received $100 million financing round, valuing the company at $1.5 billion. The round was led by Insight Partners and SoftBank Vision Fund2, and included NFL Hall of Famer Peyton Manning, Connect Ventures and Will Ventures. In January 2022 it was reported that Fanatics was divesting its 60% stake in Candy Digital.

In August 2021, Fanatics secured long-term Trading Cards manufacturing and distribution rights from MLB, MLBPA, NBA, NBPA and NFLPA, starting 2026. A month later, Fanatics Collectibles, Fanatics’ new trading cards and collectibles business, secured a $350 million Series A round at $10.4 billion valuation. Fanatics acquired Topps, the preeminent licensed trading card brand that has serviced collectors, fans and retailers for more than 70 years, in early 2022. As part of the deal, approximately 350 global Topps sports and entertainment employees joined Fanatics and the iconic brand will continue to operate under Fanatics Collectibles.

In February 2022, Fanatics, along with some of the biggest names in sports, entertainment and culture, acquired lifestyle and streetwear brand Mitchell & Ness from Juggernaut Capital Partners. Mitchell & Ness will continue to operate as a separate, distinct brand within the Fanatics Commerce division. In April 2022, Fanatics announced a $1.5 billion fundraising round which brought the company’s most recent valuation to $27 billion. More than half of the money raised came from strategic partners, including sports leagues, players’ associations, and team owners, with the single biggest investor being the NFL.

Sports leagues

NBA 

In 2015, the NBA announced a multi-year partnership with Fanatics to operate its 25,000 sq ft flagship store in New York City. Since Fanatics also operates the online NBAStore.com, customers of the New York City store are able to browse and purchase from the entire online inventory through in-store handheld devices.

NFL 
In March 2016, the NFL and Fanatics agreed to a new long-term extension to operate NFLShop.com. The NFLPA also granted Fanatics the rights for player merchandise. Fanatics will replace Nike as the largest maker and seller of player merchandise starting in March 2017.

NASCAR 
In 2015, Fanatics obtained a licence from NASCAR to sell the merchandise trackside at all 36 Monster Energy NASCAR Cup Series races and select NASCAR Xfinity Series races. This contract eliminated car owner and sponsor-owned merchandising haulers, which had previously sold mixed merchandise and limited edition items in favor of a singular "superstore" shopping area with one checkout zone for all merchandise, generally located outside one track entrance. It was initiated in August 2015 at the Pocono Raceway. By 2017 however, the plan was considered a failure due to limited merchandise and poor foot traffic, and it led to a decline in overall at-track merchandise sales. Larger tracks such as Daytona International Speedway utilized the first turn for merchandising, however, the majority of fans did not enter through this area as well as the many fans camping infield. Sponsors were unable to find places for drivers to initiate fan contact as they had previously in merchandise haulers for events such as autograph signings. 

Fanatics currently employs a "hybrid" system with a blend of haulers and smaller Fanatics tents (size/space varies per track). This allows Fanatics to reach more fans, especially once inside the gates and has reopened the door for NASCAR and driver sponsor interaction. Fanatics President Ross Tannenbaum indicated, "We've got all this money and all this product invested [in the tent] and it's sitting outside the gates where there is nobody coming [while the race is happening]. All those people are inside and at some point walking around or doing something and there's a very poor product offering. To have the best shopping experience, our goal would be to have a really strong offering of product out front like we have today but do a better job of having destination shopping inside the track." In July 2017, it was revealed that the drivers only get as little as 1 to 3 percent of the profits that Fanatics make while Fanatics make 75 percent of the profit. This has led drivers such as Kyle Larson and Ricky Stenhouse Jr. to be vocal and seek changes. On November 2, 2018, Fanatics announced they would no longer provide the trailers for the series, though Fanatics would continue with online sales until 2024.

NHL 

In 2017, the National Hockey League partnered with Adidas and unveiled a new hockey jersey with Fanatics making the jerseys themselves as the new standard jersey for fans while Adidas manufactures the on-ice jerseys, though Adidas will discontinue providing on-ice jerseys following the 2023-24 season.  Fanatics and Adidas also partnered up to make NHL hats in 2017, ending the 20 year New Era contract.

MLB 
In December 2015, MLB announced a merchandise deal that split the rights between Fanatics and Nike.

In August 2021, it was announced that Fanatics would take over the MLB baseball cards license from Topps after 2026. With the subsequent purchase of Topps by Fanatics in January 2022, the license began immediately.

MLS
MLS and Fanatics began their partnership in 2017.

Formula 1 
In 2020, Fanatics announced a partnership with Formula One for merchandise production and sales. The deal was extended in July 2021 after a surge in e-commerce sales.

NPB 
In 2018, Fanatics announced a ten year partnership with the Fukuoka SoftBank Hawks of Nippon Professional Baseball for merchandise production and sales through their Majestic Athletic brand, becoming the first team in all of Asia to partner with Fanatics. This also included becoming the official uniform partner of the Hawks through 2029. As of 2023, Fanatics is under partnership with the Chiba Lotte Marines, Tohoku Rakuten Golden Eagles, Saitama Seibu Lions, Tokyo Yakult Swallows, and Yomiuri Giants.

Other ventures 

In January 2015, Fanatics began selling a collection of casual womenswear designed by Ricki Noel Lander called Let Loose By RNL. In October 2019, Fanatics teamed up with sports broadcaster Erin Andrews on a line of clothing.

In 2017, Fanatics signed a manufacturing, design and e-commerce partnership with English association football club Aston Villa, a first for an English club. In 2022, this partnership was extended, after Aston Villa reported they had seen a 450% increase in e-commerce sales under this agreement. In July & August 2021, Fanatics struck a similar deal with Manchester United, Chelsea, Derby County and Everton.

In June 2020, Fanatics announced a ten-year licensing, manufacturing and e-commerce partnership with French soccer club Paris Saint-Germain. There are also partnerships with German clubs Schalke and Bayern Munich, as well as Spanish club Atlético Madrid.

Fanatics have licensing partnerships with the England national football team, the Canada men's national soccer team and the England national rugby union team.

In February 2023, the company announced a move into livestreamed shopping centered around trading cards and collectibles. As part of its efforts, it hired Nick Bell, then of Snap, to lead this new effort. The new business would be called Fanatics Live, and Bell would serve as CEO, with an estimated launch in the second half of the year. There would be a standalone app as well as a website. So-called Fanatics would receive a percentage of each transaction. This move came as livestreamed shopping was growing in popularity in the US, with more established brands like Nordstrom, Petco, and Walmart as well as TikTok and EBay already involved in the space but with more potential to growth, with the vast majority of US adults not having heard of it at the time of the announcement. For Fanatics, it came after the acquisition of Topps trading cards in January 2022.

References

External links
 

Companies based in Jacksonville, Florida
Retail companies established in 1995
Sporting goods retailers of the United States
Silver Lake (investment firm) companies
Online retailers of the United States
1995 establishments in Florida
Multinational companies based in Jacksonville